Natalie Garcia (born 21 March 2003) is a Canadian rhythmic gymnast.

Garcia competed at the 2018 Youth Olympics in the individual all-around event and at the 2019 Pan American Games where she won a silver medal in the clubs event.

She also competed at the Pacific Rim Gymnastics Championships in 2016, where she won silver medals in the team and junior ribbon events, and in 2018, where she won silver medals in the team and junior clubs events and bronze medals in the junior hoop and ball events.

References

External links
 

2003 births
Living people
Gymnasts from Toronto
Canadian rhythmic gymnasts
Pan American Games medalists in gymnastics
Pan American Games silver medalists for Canada
Gymnasts at the 2019 Pan American Games
Gymnasts at the 2018 Summer Youth Olympics
Medalists at the 2019 Pan American Games
21st-century Canadian women